Janice Elaine Voss (October 8, 1956 – February 6, 2012) was an American engineer and a NASA astronaut. Voss received her B.S. in engineering science from Purdue University, her M.S. in electrical engineering from MIT, and her PhD in aeronautics and astronautics from MIT. She flew in space five times, jointly holding the record for American women. Voss died in Arizona on February 6, 2012, from breast cancer.

Education 
Voss was born in South Bend, Indiana in 1956 and grew up in Rockford, Illinois where she received her kindergarten-6th grade education from Maud E. Johnson Elementary School and Guilford Center School. In 1972, Voss graduated from Minnechaug Regional High School in Wilbraham, Massachusetts. After high school, Voss went on to earn her Bachelor of Science in engineering science from Purdue University in 1975. During her time at Purdue, she was a member of Alpha Phi Omega. Voss continued her education at MIT, earning her Master of Science degree in electrical engineering in 1977, completing her thesis on Kalman filtering techniques. From 1973 to 1975, Voss took correspondence courses at the University of Oklahoma. From 1977 to 1978, she completed work in space physics at Rice University. In 1983, Voss became a Draper Fellow while continuing her graduate studies in the Draper Laboratory at MIT. As a Draper Laboratory Fellow, she worked on developing software for the space shuttle program. Voss earned her Doctor of Philosophy in aeronautics and astronautics from MIT in 1987. For her PhD work, Voss focused on developing algorithms to identify frequencies, damping, and mode shapes for the International Space Station.

Inspiration 

Voss has cited Madeleine L'Engle's 1962 novel A Wrinkle in Time as one of her primary inspirations for becoming an astronaut. The book tells the story of a young girl who must travel through time to save her father. In the book, the young girl's mother is a Nobel Prize winning biologist. Voss claims that the powerful female roles did not strike her as unusual, but were the norms she accepted in life. Voss flew a copy of A Wrinkle in Time onboard STS-94 and mailed it to Madeleine L'Engle.

Career 
Voss first became involved with NASA in 1973 while she was still pursuing her bachelor's degree. She worked as co-op at the NASA Johnson Space Center until she graduated with her B.S. degree in 1975. During her time at Johnson Space Center she worked on Computer simulation in the Engineering and Development Directorate. She later returned to Johnson Space Center in 1977, and spent one year working as a crew trainer, teaching entry guidance and navigation. After completing her PhD in 1987 she began working at Orbital Sciences Corporation, where she worked on mission integration and flight operations to support for an upper stage called the Transfer Orbit Stage (TOS). In the Fall of 1992, TOS launched the Mars Observer from a Titan rocket and the Advanced Communications Technology Satellite in September 1993.

In 1990, Voss was selected by NASA as an astronaut candidate, and became an astronaut in 1991. She served as a mission specialist on missions STS-57 (1993), STS-63 (1995), STS-83 (1997), STS-94 (1997) and STS-99 (2000). During her career as an astronaut, her technical assignments included working Spacelab/Spacehab issues for the Astronaut Office Mission Development Branch, and robotics issues for the Robotics Branch. She participated in the first shuttle rendezvous with the Mir space station on STS-63, which flew around the station testing communications and in-flight maneuvers for later missions, but never actually docked. As an STS-99 crew member on the Shuttle Radar Topography Mission, she and her fellow crew members worked continuously in shifts to produce what was at the time the most accurate digital topographic map of the Earth. Voss logged over 49 days in space, traveled 18.8 million miles in 779 Earth orbits, and all of her missions included at least one other woman.

From October 2004 to November 2007, she was the Science Director for NASA's Kepler Space Observatory, an Earth-orbiting satellite designed to find Earth-like extrasolar planets in nearby planetary systems. It was launched in March 2009 and operated through October 2018. At the Astronaut Office Station Branch, she served as the Payloads Lead. She also worked for Orbital Sciences Corporation in flight operations support.

Honors and dedication 

Voss received several honors in her lifetime:

 National Science Foundation Fellowship; 1976
Howard Hughes Fellowship; 1981
Zonta Amelia Earhart Fellowship; 1982
Draper Fellow; 1983
NASA spaceflight medal; 1993, 1995

The Cygnus CRS Orb-2 spacecraft was named SS Janice Voss in her honor.

The VOSS Model is a scaled model of the Solar System, dedicated to Janice Voss, located at Purdue University's Discovery Park in West Lafayette, Indiana.

References

External links 
 NASA biography

1956 births
2012 deaths
American astronauts
Deaths from cancer in Arizona
Deaths from breast cancer
Women astronauts
Rice University alumni
MIT School of Engineering alumni
People from Rockford, Illinois
Purdue University College of Engineering alumni
American women engineers
NASA
American aerospace engineers
Space Shuttle program astronauts
Engineers from Indiana
21st-century American women